Percy John Richardson (2 April 1891 – 23 March 1964) was an English cricketer. He was born at Snaresbrook, Essex.

Richardson made his first-class debut in 1912 for Cambridge University against HDG Leveson-Gower's XI at The Saffrons in Eastbourne.  This was the only first-class match he played for the university.  In the same season he played 2 first-class matches for Essex against Hampshire in the County Championship and the touring South Africans.  In his 3 first-class matches, he scored 44 runs at a batting average of 11.00, with a high score of 21.

He died at Reigate, Surrey on 23 March 1964.

References

External links

1891 births
1964 deaths
People from the London Borough of Redbridge
People from Essex (before 1965)
English cricketers
Cambridge University cricketers
Essex cricketers